The Greenville Area School District is a small, rural, public school district serving parts of Mercer County, Pennsylvania. It is centered in the borough of Greenville and also covers Sugar Grove Township and Hempfield Townships.

According to 2000 federal census data, it serves a resident population of 13,500. By 2010, the Greenville Area School District's population declined to 10,627 people. In 2009, the District residents' per capita income was $16,944, while the median family income was $42,421. The School District was formed in 1810.

Greenville Area School District operates two schools: Greenville Elementary School (K-6) and Greenville Junior/Senior High School (7-12).

Extracurriculars
Greenville Area School District offers a variety of clubs, activities and an extensive sports program. The Greenville High School Band has won local and regional competitions. The district offers several sports in cooperation with neighboring Commodore Perry School District, including Soccer for boys and girls and baseball.

Sports
The District funds:

Boys
Basketball- AA
Cross Country - A
Football - AA
Golf - AA
Tennis - AA
Track and Field - AA
Wrestling	- AA

Girls
Basketball - AA
Cross Country - AA
Girls' Tennis - A
Track and Field - AA
Volleyball - AA

Junior High School Sports

Boys
Basketball
Cross Country
Football
Track and Field
Wrestling	

Girls
Basketball
Cross Country
Track and Field
Volleyball

According to PIAA directory July 2013

References

School districts in Mercer County, Pennsylvania